Conduelo Gisleno Píriz (born in Montevideo, June 17, 1905 — December 25, 1976) was a Uruguayan footballer who played for the Uruguay national team. He was part of the squad which won the first ever World Cup in 1930, but he did not play any matches in the tournament. He was a club player of Nacional.

References

World Cup Champions Squads 1930 - 2002
O nascimento da mítica Celeste Olímpica 

1905 births
Footballers from Montevideo
Uruguayan footballers
Uruguay international footballers
1930 FIFA World Cup players
FIFA World Cup-winning players
Club Nacional de Football players
Defensor Sporting players
Uruguayan Primera División players
1976 deaths
Association football midfielders